Patrice Nisbett (born 1971 in St. James Parish, Nevis) is Nevisian politician. He was Attorney General of Saint Kitts and Nevis and minister of justice from 2010 to 2013.
He was then appointed as foreign minister of the federal government, and served until the elections of 2015. 

He was an elected member of the National Assembly, representing the Nevis Reformation Party.

References

1971 births
Living people
Government ministers of Saint Kitts and Nevis
Nevis Reformation Party politicians
Members of the National Assembly (Saint Kitts and Nevis)
Attorneys General of Saint Kitts and Nevis
Foreign Ministers of Saint Kitts and Nevis
21st-century Saint Kitts and Nevis lawyers
People from Nevis